Toy is the fourth studio album by the American punk rock band A Giant Dog. It was released in August 2017 under Merge Records.

Track listing

References

2017 albums
Merge Records albums